Live Year 2004 is the third Live DVD released by the Japanese band Do As Infinity. The DVD contains concerts which were held at Dallas (2004-06-04), New York (2004-06-07), Hibiya Kokaido (2004-9-23), Osaka Yagai Ongakudo (2004-09-26) and Shibuya (2004-09-29).

Track list

Recorded on 2004-06-04 Dallas / 2004-06-07 New York:

Dallas off shot
New York off shot 1
Fukai Mori (深い森)
New York off shot 2

Recorded on 2004-09-23 Hibiya Kokaido / 2004-09-26 Osaka Yagai Ongakudo:

Osaka Yagai Ongakudo off shot
Break of Dawn
Mellow Amber
Wings
MC
Nice & Easy
MC
Enrai (遠雷)
We are.
Kagaku no Yoru (科学の夜)
Tooku Made (遠くまで)
Boukensha tachi (冒険者たち)
Call & Response
One or Eight

Recorded on 2004-09-29 Duo Music Exchange:

Shibuya Duo off shot
Summer Days
Under the Sun
Tsubasa no Keikaku (翼の計画)
MC
BE FREE
Rumble Fish
Mahou no Kotoba ~Would You Marry Me?~ (魔法の言葉)
Signal (シグナル)
Honjitsu wa Seiten Nari (本日ハ晴天ナリ)
Tsurezure naru Mama ni (徒然なるままに)
Happy Birthday
Ai no Uta (あいのうた)

External links
Live Year 2004 official listing 

Do As Infinity video albums